The List of BSN champions are the champions of the Baloncesto Superior Nacional (BSN) Championship Finals, which is the championship series for the BSN and the conclusion of the professional basketball's league tournament in Puerto Rico. Most Finals have been played in a best-of-seven format. The winning team of the series receives the championship trophy.

The Vaqueros de Bayamon lead the league for most championships won at 16. They are followed by two teams that have 14 titles; those teams are the Atléticos de San Germán and Leones de Ponce. The latter three teams have won a combined 44 of 89 championships.

Champions

Results by teams

 These titles are from Farmacia Martin team that was unified with the Atléticos de San Germán

See also
 Baloncesto Superior Nacional (BSN)
 BSN Most Valuable Player Award

References

External links 
 Puerto Rican League official website 
 BSNPR.com: List of champions 

Champions